Dwight Baldwin may refer to:

 Dwight Hamilton Baldwin (1821–1899), American piano manufacturer
 Dwight Baldwin (missionary) (1798–1886), American Christian missionary and physician on Maui
 [[David Dwight Baldwi1831–1912), Hawaiian educator on Maui known as D. Dwight Baldwin